Eubranchus ocellatus is a species of sea slug or nudibranch, a marine gastropod mollusc in the family Eubranchidae.

Distribution
This species was described from Waltair, Vizagapatam, Bay of Bengal, India. It is reported from many localities in the Indo-Pacific region.

References

External links
 

Eubranchidae
Gastropods described in 1864